Hot Flesh Rumble - The Scaramanga Six Live in Session is a compilation album by The Scaramanga Six. It compiles live-in-the-studio recordings made for radio between 2004 and 2007, and was released in between the band's fourth and fifth studio albums.

Reception

Reviewing the album in Vibrations magazine, Rob Paul Chapman wrote "It would be easy to conclude that these are just off-cuts and make-weights but the scale of the songs in such a confined environment breathes new life into the recorded work... Shorn of the bells and whistles, with the energy of a live performance, there is a strong argument for "Elemental" and "Pincers" to be considered the definitive recordings"

Track listing

Personnel 

Paul Morricone – vocals, guitars, baritone saxophone
Steven Morricone – vocals, bass guitar, tenor saxophone
Julia Arnez – guitars, vocals
Chris Catalyst - organ, piano, backing vocals, trombone, drums 
Gareth Champion - drums (tracks 9-18)
Anthony Sargeant - drums (tracks 1-8)

References 

2008 compilation albums
The Scaramanga Six albums